Patriarch Sophronius may refer to:

 Sophronius of Jerusalem, ruled in 634–638
 Patriarch Sophronius I of Alexandria, ruled in 841–860
 Sophronius I of Constantinople, ruled in 1463–1464
 Patriarch Sophronius II of Alexandria, Greek Patriarch of Alexandria in 941
 Sophronius II of Constantinople, Ecumenical Patriarch in 1774–1780
 Patriarch Sophronius III of Alexandria, ruled in 1116–1171
 Sophronius III of Constantinople, ruled in 1863–1866
 Patriarch Sophronius IV of Alexandria, ruled in 1870–1899 (same person than Sophronius III of Constantinople)